Tzistarakis Mosque is an Ottoman mosque, built in 1759, in Monastiraki Square, central Athens, Greece. It is now functioning as an annex of the Museum of Greek Folk Art.

History
The mosque was built in 1759, by the Ottoman governor (voevoda) of Athens, Mustapha Agha Tzistarakis (In original Turkish: Dizdar Mustafa Ağa, Dizdar being a rank in the Ottoman system). According to tradition, Tzistarakis used one of the pillars of the Temple of Olympian Zeus to make lime for the building, although it is more likely that he used one of the columns of the nearby Hadrian's Library. This act led to his dismissal as the Turks considered it a sacrilege which would cause vengeful spirits to be loosened upon the city, a superstition that some Athenians believed to have been confirmed when there was an outbreak of the plague later in the year.

The mosque was also known as the "Mosque of the Lower Fountain" (Τζαμί του Κάτω Σιντριβανιού) or "Mosque of the Lower Market" (Τζαμί του Κάτω Παζαριού) from its proximity to the Ancient Agora of Athens. During the Greek War of Independence, the building was used as an assembly hall for the local town elders. After Greek independence, it was used in various ways: thus it was the site of a ball in honour of King Otto of Greece in March 1834, and was also employed as a barracks, a prison and a storehouse.

In 1915, it was partly rebuilt under the supervision of architect Anastasios Orlandos, and was used to house the Museum of Greek Handwork from 1918 (in 1923 renamed to National Museum of Decorative Arts) until 1973. In 1966, it was provisionally refurbished to provide a place of prayer during the stay of the deposed King of Saudi Arabia, Saud, in the city.

In 1973, the main functions of the Museum of Greek Folk Art moved to 17 Kydathinaion Str., with the mosque remaining as an annex to it. The V. Kyriazopoulos pottery collection of ceramics remains in the mosque to this day. In 1981, the building was damaged by an earthquake and was re-opened to the public in 1991.

See also
 Church of the Pantanassa, Athens
 List of former mosques in Greece
 List of mosques in Greece

References

Further reading

External links

www.athensinfoguide.com (Greek only)
Monastiraki Photo Guide

18th-century mosques
Ottoman architecture in Athens
Folk art museums and galleries in Greece
Former mosques in Greece
Museums in Athens
Ottoman mosques in Greece
Mosques in Athens
1759 establishments in the Ottoman Empire
18th-century architecture in Greece
Mosques completed in 1740
Mosque buildings with domes